The Washington State Legislative Youth Advisory Council (LYAC) is the official nonpartisan youth advisory body to the Washington State Legislature on issues related to young people in Washington. Created in July 2005, it consists of approximately 22 members, each serving a two-year term. According to state law, the mission of LYAC is to "examine issues of importance to youth, including but not limited to education, employment, strategies to increase youth participation in state and municipal government, safe environments for youth, substance abuse, emotional and physical health, foster care, poverty, homelessness, and youth access to services on a statewide and municipal basis."

LYAC is administered by the Office of the Lieutenant Governor of Washington. From 2020 to 2021, the Council was administered in collaboration with the nonprofit Washington State Leadership Board. In addition to its work with the legislature, LYAC has collaborated with other state government agencies, including the Office of the Attorney General of Washington, the Washington State Department of Health, the Office of Superintendent of Public Instruction (OSPI), and the Washington Department of Children, Youth, and Families.

History

Funding and Administration 
LYAC was initially proposed by 12-year-old Alex Jonlin, who envisioned a “bureau of children’s opinions” to finally incorporate youth into discussions of major youth policy. Jonlin worked with his state senator, Ken Jacobsen, to create an organization founded on authentic youth engagement and involvement. With the passage of Senate Bill (SB) 5254 in 2005, LYAC was established as a pilot program with a sunset clause which took effect in 2007. Then-Governor Christine Gregoire, in collaboration with the legislature, appointed the first 22 members. The OSPI was designated to provide staff support and administration, but no funding was offered by the legislature to support this. However, unpaid cooperation between Washington State Senate staff, OSPI staff, and LYAC enabled the students to launch the initiative successfully.

In 2007, with the passage of House Bill (HB) 1052, LYAC's sunset clause was moved back to 2009. This legislation also adjusted the member appointment process, so that the council itself selected new youth members based on its own established criteria. New acceptances were notified by the Lieutenant Governor. HB 1052 also codified the ability of LYAC to accept grants and donations. The 2007-2009 legislative budget also included dedicated funding to LYAC for the first time, in addition to a Civic Education Travel Grant from the OSPI that allowed students to travel from around the state to take part in LYAC-hosted events.

In 2009, the sunset clause was removed entirely. However, due to the ongoing Recession, LYAC lost its funding from the legislature and was entirely dependent on the support of volunteers and private donations. It was not until 2019 that the council once again began receiving appropriations from the state. In 2020, a new law was passed allowing collaboration in the facilitation of LYAC between the Office of the Lieutenant Governor and the Washington State Leadership Board, a nonprofit authorized by state law.

Successful Legislation 
One of the codified responsibilities of LYAC is to advise the legislature on "proposed and pending legislation." As a result, each year the council lobbies legislators and testifies in committee hearings on behalf of legislation it feels positively impacts youth. LYAC also writes and passes its own legislation, such as HB 1373. Below is a non-comprehensive list of LYAC-endorsed legislation that has passed into law.

Activities of the Council 
RCW 43.15.095 outlines the council's duties as follows:

 Advising the legislature on proposed and pending legislation, including state budget expenditures and policy matters relating to youth.
 Advising the standing committees of the legislature and study commissions, committees, and task forces regarding issues relating to youth.
 Conducting periodic seminars for its members regarding leadership, government, and the legislature.
 Accepting and soliciting for grants and donations from public and private sources to support the activities of the council.
 Reporting annually by December 1 to the legislature on its activities, including proposed legislation that implements recommendations of the council.

However, the projects LYAC has pursued in recent years have expanded much beyond its minimum duties. In 2008, the council launched Action Day, an annual event that has since brought together thousands of youth from around the state to the Washington State Capitol. Attendees of the event have had the chance to listen to speakers including, but not limited to: Governor Jay Inslee, Lieutenant Governor Denny Heck, Lieutenant Governor Cyrus Habib, Attorney General Bob Ferguson, Superintendent of Public Instruction Chris Reykdal, Secretary of State Kim Wyman, State Treasurer Mike Pelliciotti, Assistant Majority Whip Senator Claire Wilson, Secretary of the Senate Brad Hendrickson, Educational Consultant Erin Jones, and Mockingbird Society Executive Director Annie Blackledge. At Action Day, attendees also have the opportunity to learn from workshops hosted by LYAC, connect with peers from around the state, and apply newly learned skills in advocacy meetings with legislators.

LYAC has also hosted other events, including town halls and workshops about the McCleary Decision, civic engagement, the council's legislative priorities, and nonverbal communication. During the 2020 election, the council hosted virtual interviews with the candidates for governor and lieutenant governor about youth issues.

LYAC frequently supports task forces and work groups hosted by various state government agencies. In 2019, the council advised the OSPI's Comprehensive Sexual Health Education Workgroup, whose recommendations led to SB 5395, which required comprehensive sexual education in public schools. LYAC endorsed and lobbied for the successful bill, which was later reaffirmed with the passage of Washington Referendum 90. The efforts were later covered in Teen Vogue. In 2020, the council partnered with the Washington state Office of the Attorney General on the creation of a 24-hour statewide hotline for receiving information related to youth safety and well-being. The same year, members advised the state Department of Health on COVID-19 vaccine distribution prioritization and worked with the OSPI on its From Seed to Apple initiative.

LYAC collaborates year-round with many community organizations around the state in order to more accurately represent youth opinion, support the mission of those groups, and promote increased civic engagement.

Recognition 

 In 2012, as part of the Washington state legislature, LYAC won the Kevin B. Harrington Award.
 In 2014, LYAC won the Colleen Willoughby Youth Civic Engagement Award.
 In 2015, LYAC was a Harvard Kennedy School Innovations in American Government Award Semi-Finalist.
 In 2017, LYAC was recognized as a Harvard Kennedy School Bright Idea.

The work of LYAC has been covered in the AP, Washington Post, Q-13 Fox, KIRO Seattle, The Seattle Times, The U.S. News & World Report, Teen Vogue, KING-5, KNKX, the San Francisco Chronicle, The Spokesman Review, MasonWebTV, OPB News, YakTri News, EIN News, The Yakima Herald-Republic, the Times Union, Sequim Gazette, Centralia Chronicle, Seattle Medium, South Sound Emerald, GzKATU, The News Tribune, the Fairfield Citizen, the Houston Chronicle, Seattle PI, Beaumont Enterprise, CTpost, Greenwich Times, News Times, Magic Valley, RegisteredCitizen, The Reflector, South Whidbey Record, Michigan's Thumb, The Ridgefield Press, KTVZ Idaho, KXLY, KHQ, Washington Law & Politics, and TV Washington.

In 2008, LYAC worked with the state of Indiana's Department of Education in the creation of a Legislative Youth Advisory Council there. LYAC has advised the states of California, New York, Massachusetts, New York, and Virginia in their efforts to pursue a similar idea in years since. In 2016, members met with international leaders at the World Affairs Council of Seattle to brainstorm the applicability of LYAC's mission on a global scale in countries such as Saudi Arabia, Sudan, and Mexico. There are also youth councils established in the states of Louisiana, Maryland, and Colorado, though it is unknown whether Washington LYAC had an advisory role in their creation.

References

External links
Washington State Legislative Youth Advisory Council
LYAC Instagram

Youth organizations based in Washington (state)
Government of Washington (state)